Bangladesh competed at the 2020 Summer Olympics in Tokyo. Originally scheduled to take place from 24 July to 9 August 2020, the Games were postponed to 23 July to 8 August 2021, because of the COVID-19 pandemic. It was the nation's tenth appearance at the Summer Olympics.

Competitors
The following is the list of number of competitors in the Games.

Archery

For the first time in Olympic history, one Bangladeshi archer directly qualified for the men's individual recurve at the Games by reaching the quarterfinal stage and obtaining one of the four available spots at the 2019 World Archery Championships in 's-Hertogenbosch, Netherlands.

Athletics

Bangladesh received a universality slot from the World Athletics to send a male track and field athlete to the Olympics.

Track & road events

Shooting

Bangladesh received an invitation from the Tripartite Commission to send a men's rifle shooter to the Olympics, as long as the minimum qualifying score (MQS) was fulfilled by June 5, 2021.

Qualification Legend: Q = Qualify for the next round; q = Qualify for the bronze medal (shotgun)

Swimming

Bangladesh received a universality invitation from FINA to send two top-ranked swimmers (one per gender) in their respective individual events to the Olympics, based on the FINA Points System of June 28, 2021.

References

Nations at the 2020 Summer Olympics
2020
2021 in Bangladeshi sport